Taukay-Gayna (Tawqay-Ğäynä) is a rural locality (a selo) in Kacheganovsky Selsoviet, Miyakinsky District, Bashkortostan, Russia. The population was 156 as of 2010. There are 4 streets.

Geography 
Taukay-Gayna is located 27 km southeast of Kirgiz-Miyaki (the district's administrative centre) by road. Kacheganovo is the nearest rural locality.

References 

Rural localities in Miyakinsky District